White Christmas is the first Christmas album by Pat Boone. it was released in 1959 on Dot Records.

Track listing

References 

1959 albums
Pat Boone albums
Dot Records albums
Pop Christmas albums